Isobaculum is a Gram-positive and facultatively anaerobic genus of bacteria from the family of Carnobacteriaceae, with one known species (Isobaculum melis). Isobaculum melis has been isolated from the intestine of a badger in England.

References

Lactobacillales
Monotypic bacteria genera
Bacteria genera